Tibetan is a Unicode block containing characters for the Tibetan, Dzongkha, and other languages of China, Bhutan, Nepal, Mongolia, northern India, eastern Pakistan and Russia.

Block

Former Tibetan block 

The Tibetan Unicode block is unique for having been allocated in version 1.0.0 with a virama-based encoding that was unable to distinguish visible  and conjunct consonant correctly. This encoding was removed from the Unicode Standard in version 1.0.1 in the process of unifying with ISO 10646 for version 1.1, then reintroduced as an explicit root/subjoined encoding, with a larger block size, in version 2.0. Moving or removing existing characters has been prohibited by the Unicode Stability Policy for all versions following Unicode 2.0, so the Tibetan characters encoded in Unicode 2.0 and all subsequent versions are immutable.

The range of the former Unicode 1.0.0 Tibetan block has been occupied by the Myanmar block since Unicode 3.0. In Microsoft Windows, collation data referring to the old Tibetan block was retained as late as Windows XP, and removed in Windows 2003.

History
The following Unicode-related documents record the purpose and process of defining specific characters in the Tibetan block:

Footnotes

References 

 A Chinese concern posted to the Unicode Consortium citing the conjunct character "སྐྤྵྴྍྐ" (EWTS s+k+p+Sh+sh+x+ka; IAST ), showing the complexity of encoding. (Devanagari encoding never allowed "ᳵ" to be conjuncted, i.e. "स्क्प्ष्श्ᳵ्क"does not exist.)

Unicode blocks